Nordbotn is a village in the municipality of Hitra in Trøndelag county, Norway.  It is located on the east side of the island of Fjellværsøya.  Nordbotn Church is located in this village which was once a trading post with a post office, bakery, and store.

References

Hitra
Villages in Trøndelag